William Severlyn Hewitt (born August 8, 1944) is a retired American professional basketball player.

A 6'7" forward from the University of Southern California, Hewitt played six seasons (1968–1973;1974–1975) in the National Basketball Association as a member of the Los Angeles Lakers, Detroit Pistons, Buffalo Braves, and Chicago Bulls.  He earned NBA All-Rookie Team honors during the 1968–69 NBA season after averaging 7.2 points per game for the Lakers.

References

External links

1944 births
Living people
American men's basketball players
Basketball players from Massachusetts
Buffalo Braves players
Cambridge Rindge and Latin School alumni
Chicago Bulls players
Detroit Pistons players
Los Angeles Lakers draft picks
Los Angeles Lakers players
Mt. SAC Mounties men's basketball players
Small forwards
Sportspeople from Cambridge, Massachusetts
USC Trojans men's basketball players